Vũ Ngọc Thịnh (born 8 July 1992) is a Vietnamese footballer who plays as a centre-back for V.League 1 side Hải Phòng.

Honours

International

Vietnam U23
 Third place : Southeast Asian Games: 2015

References 

Vietnamese footballers
Association football central defenders
V.League 1 players
Vietnam international footballers
1992 births
Living people
People from Haiphong
Binh Dinh FC players
Haiphong FC players
Southeast Asian Games bronze medalists for Vietnam
Southeast Asian Games medalists in football
Competitors at the 2015 Southeast Asian Games